Wymon Henderson (born December 15, 1961) is a former cornerback who played eight seasons for the Minnesota Vikings, Denver Broncos, and Los Angeles Rams in the National Football League.  He started in Super Bowl XXIV.

References
Foxsports
IMDb
Thegoal

1961 births
Living people
People from North Miami Beach, Florida
American football cornerbacks
UNLV Rebels football players
Minnesota Vikings players
Denver Broncos players
Los Angeles Rams players